Northern Territory Football Club, nicknamed NT Thunder, was a Northern Territory-based Australian rules football club that competed in the North East Australian Football League (NEAFL) between 2011 and 2019. It also competed in the VFL Women's in 2018-19. Under-19 boys and girls development teams, sporting the team uniform, continue the Thunder's representation in the NAB League Boys and Girls competitions.

History
The Northern Territory Thunder were formed in 2008 and were invited to join the West Australian Football League but instead opted to join the Queensland Australian Football League (QAFL). At the conclusion of the 2011 QAFL season the Thunder, along with nine other Queensland-based teams, were invited to join the newly formed North East Australian Football League. The Thunder finished the regular season with the best record in the Northern Conference and in doing so claimed their first ever minor premiership. The Thunder went on to prove their superiority by claiming the first ever Northern Conference NEAFL premiership by defeating the Morningside Panthers. A week later the Thunder defeated the newly crowned Eastern Conference NEAFL premiers, Ainslie Tri-Colours, to claim the first ever NEAFL premiership at Traeger Park.

The Thunder won two NEAFL premierships and entered a side in the VFL Women's competition in Victoria. By the end of the 2019 season however AFL Northern Territory revealed it could no longer justify keeping the club afloat, and announced its cessation from both competitions.

2017 squad

Honour board

Legend: 
 Premiers,    Finals 
Bold italics: competition leading goal kicker

Honours and achievements

Premierships

Club Champions

2009 – Cameron Ilett
2010 – Cameron Ilett
2011 – Jake Dignan
2012 – Jason Roe
2013 – Cameron Ilett
2014 – Cameron Ilett
2015 – Richard Tambling
2016 – Cameron Ilett
2017 – Cameron Ilett

Grogan Medallists 

The Grogan Medal was awarded between 2011 and 2013 to the best and fairest player in the NEAFL Northern Conference.

Cameron Ilett (2011)

Ray Hughson Medallists
The Ray Hughson Medal was awarded in the QAFL until 2010, and in the NEAFL  Northern Conference between 2011 and 2013 to the leading goalkicker.
Darren Ewing (2009) – 81 goals
Darren Ewing (2011) – 115 goals
Darren Ewing (2013) – 94 goals

NEAFL leading goalkicker
The NEAFL leading goalkicker has been awarded since 2014 to the player who kicks the most goals in the NEAFL competition.
Darren Ewing (2015) – 78 goals
Darren Ewing (2016) – 58 goals
Darren Ewing (2017) – 61 goals

NEAFL (Northern) Rising Stars 
The NEAFL (Northern) Rising Star was awarded between 2011 and 2013 to the best young player in the Northern Conference.

Ross Tungatalum (2011)

NEAFL Rising Stars 
The NEAFL (Northern) Rising Star has been awarded since 2014 to the best young player in the NEAFL competition.

Adam Sambono (2017)

Premiership coaches 
Murray Davis (2011)
Xavier Clarke (2015)

NEAFL Coach of the Year
The NEAFL Coach of the Year has been awarded since 2014 to the best coach in the NEAFL competition.

 Murray Davis (2011)

Xavier Clarke (2014)

QAFL Team of the Year representatives
NT Thunder competed in the QAFL between 2009 and 2010 before joining the NEAFL.
Darren Ewing (2009)
Cameron Ilett (2009, 2010)
Jarred Ilett (2009– captain)
Peter MacFarlane (2009)
Brett Goodes (2010)
Zephaniah Skinner (2010)

NEAFL Team of the Year representatives
Between 2011 and 2013, the Team of the Year representatives were from the Northern Conference. Since 2014, the representatives have been for the whole NEAFL competition.
Darren Ewing (2011, 2012, 2013, 2014, 2015, 2016, 2017)
Cameron Ilett (2011– captain, 2013, 2014– captain, 2015– captain, 2016– captain, 2017)
Shaun Tapp (2011)
Ross Tungatalum (2011)
Kenrick Tyrrell (2011)
Jake Dignan (2012)
Jason Roe (2012)
Matt Rosier (2012)
Chris Dunne (2013, 2014)
Justin Beugelaar (2015)
Richard Tambling (2015)
Raphael Clarke (2016)
Adam Sambono (2017)

AFL players
The following is the list of NT Thunder players who have played at AFL level and the club they play(ed) for.

Jed Anderson –  and 
Dom Barry – 
Jared Brennan –  and 
Raphael Clarke – 
Nakia Cockatoo – 
Alwyn Davey – 
Nathan Djerrkura –  and 
Brett Goodes – 
Nikki Gore -  Women
Steven May – 
Ryan Nyhuis - 
Andrew McLeod – 
Liam Patrick – 
Relton Roberts – 
Jason Roe – 
Zephaniah Skinner – 
Richard Tambling –  and 
Troy Taylor – 
Austin Wonaeamirri –

Club song
The NT Thunder club song is "We are the Territory Thunder".

Match records
Correct to the end of round 17, 2017
 Highest score for: 193 points  Round 18, 2010 (Gardens Oval) – NT Thunder 29.19 (193) vs.  8.3 (51)
 Lowest score for: 28 points  Round 17, 2017 (Sydney Cricket Ground) – NT Thunder 4.4 (28) vs.  25.24 (174)
 Highest score against: 174 points  Round 17, 2017 (Sydney Cricket Ground) – NT Thunder 4.4 (28) vs.  25.24 (174)
 Lowest score against: 15 points  Round 13, 2014 (TIO Stadium) – NT Thunder 19.11 (125) vs.  1.9 (15)
 Highest aggregate score: 287 points  Round 4, 2009 (Victoria Point) – NT Thunder 20.11 (131) vs.  23.18 (156)
 Lowest aggregate score: 89 points  Elimination final, 2014 (TIO Stadium) – NT Thunder 7.11 (53) vs.  5.6 (36)
 Lowest winning score: 53 points  Elimination final, 2014 (TIO Stadium) – NT Thunder 7.11 (53) vs. Ainslie 5.6 (36)
 Highest losing score: 131 points  Round 4, 2009 (TIO Stadium) – NT Thunder 23.18 (131) vs. Redland 23.18 (156)
 Greatest winning margin: 142 points  Round 18, 2010 (Gardens Oval) – NT Thunder 29.19 (193) vs. Broadbeach 8.3 (51)
 Greatest losing margin: 146 points  Round 17, 2017 (Sydney Cricket Ground) – NT Thunder 4.4 (28) vs.  25.24 (174)
 Longest winning streak: 13 matches  Round 11, 2015 vs. Sydney University (Henson Park) to round 1, 2016 vs.  (TIO Stadium)
 Longest losing streak: 3 matches (achieved four times)  Round 15, 2009 vs. Redland (Traeger Park) to round 17, 2009 vs.  (Carrara Stadium)  Round 2, 2010 vs. Redland (Victoria Point Oval) to round 4, 2010 vs. Southport (Fankhauser Reserve)  Northern conference grand final, 2012 vs. Brisbane Lions (Leyshon Park) to round 2, 2013 vs. Aspley (Graham Road Oval)  Round 20, 2013 vs. Redland (Traeger Park) to round 22, 2013 vs. Aspley (TIO Stadium)
 Most goals in a match by an individual: 14 goals  Darren Ewing, round 19, 2013 (Leyshon Park)

References

External links

 

Queensland State Football League clubs
Australian rules football clubs in the Northern Territory
2008 establishments in Australia
Australian rules football clubs established in 2008
2019 disestablishments in Australia
Sports clubs disestablished in 2019